The Hungary men's national 3x3 team is a national basketball team of Hungary, administered by the Hungarian Basketball Federation.
It represents the country in international 3x3 (3 against 3) basketball competitions.

Competitions

3x3 Europe Cup

FIBA 3x3 World Cup

Squad

See also
Hungary men's national basketball team
Hungary women's national 3x3 team

References

Hungary national basketball team
Men's national 3x3 basketball teams